Robert Hardy (16 June 1885 – 13 July 1960) was an English footballer who played in the Football League for Bristol City. He played in the 1909 FA Cup Final where Bristol were beaten 1–0 by Manchester United. The shirt Hardy wore in the final was sold at auction for £13,000 in 2017.

References

1885 births
English footballers
English Football League players
Association football forwards
South Bank F.C. players
Bristol City F.C. players
FA Cup Final players
Year of death missing